Jonathan Palmer Scott (Jon Scott) is a Republican politician and was the party's nominee against Patrick J Kennedy in Rhode Island's 1st congressional district, in both 2006 and 2008.

Background
Scott was born in 1966 in Providence, Rhode Island, to Mary Lou Gilbert, a single mother and former Ice Capades skater and instructor. He described his mother, during a radio interview on Rhode Island's WPRO, as "amazingly industrious". According to his account, she had dropped out of Hope High School in Providence in order to pursue her skating career and received her GED. She later "worked her way through Salve Regina nursing school as a lab tech, through anesthesia school as a pediatrics nurse and, when she got a bit bored, decided to get her law degree, as well".

In 1975, his mother married Perry Scott. He has never made reference to his biological father.

Scott attended the Moses Brown School; a prestigious private Quaker school on Providence's East Side that boasts Christopher Hill, Will MacKenzie, Tom Chappell, and Vincent Cianci among its alumni.  He was at the school from elementary school through high school graduation. He later attended the University of Rhode Island, where he chaired the student senate.  Scott also attended Harvard University's continuing education division known as the Harvard Extension School.

He has never married but has a son, who is adopted. Chris is 24 and lives with his father in Providence.

Sailing career
Scott was a professional captain on racing sailboats after a college career at the University of Rhode Island in which he crewed on two Kennedy Cup winning teams – collegiate sailing's equivalent of the national championship. He later sailed as a paid professional on a variety of boats around the world. He has sailed with a number of famous sailors including ESPN commentator Gary Jobson.

In 2006, just prior to his announcement for the Congressional race, he completed his 10th Newport to Bermuda race.

Coaching career
Scott is nationally recognized as a coach and coaching educator. He coached sailing, football, wrestling and lacrosse from youth to elite levels for 18 years.

He was, at age 19, assumed to be the youngest varsity high school lacrosse head coach in the nation at the Portsmouth Abbey School, where he coached for almost ten years. He also coached wrestling at the school.

He coached wrestling for Bridgewater State College and was certified as a Freestyle Coach for USA Wrestling. He coached at the organization's Junior Olympic Developmental Camps and was a coaching instructor for them.

Professional career
Scott was a Counselor and Group Home Manager in Providence, prior to embarking on his political career. He worked with an adolescent male population and also served as a liaison to Family court and as an Educational Advocate for special education students.

Political career
Scott lost in November 2006 and November 2008 to incumbent Patrick Kennedy (D).  Scott was never able to achieve the fund raising necessary to be competitive with Kennedy.

Scott counts among his supporters Former United States Secretary of the Navy, J. William Middendorf and Grover Norquist (President of Americans for Tax Reform). Scott was the Rhode Island coordinator for Newt Gingrich's "American Solutions Day" project in 2007.

Scott has always run a transparent campaign and admitted, upfront, to having endured a bankruptcy when he first adopted his son.

Scott is now running as an Independent for mayor in Providence.  He will face the winner of a four-way Democratic Party primary in November.

References

Providence Journal 7 to 7 Blog
Kennedy, Challengers Debate Providence Journal 10/28/06
Voice of the Regular Guy Providence Journal 9/3/06
Newcomer Scott Unfazed Providence Journal 10/23/06
Kennedy Still Strong Boston Globe 11/05/06
Kennedy Rebounds CBS News
Guide to the Elections Brown Daily Herald 11/07/2006
Scott Heads to November Showdown Providence Journal 10/13/2006
What's Next for Jon Scott? Providence Phoenix 7/12/07
Reed has Nest Egg... Providence Journal 10/16/07
Meet Jon Scott; Candidate for Congress Anchor Rising interview
Anti-Tax Pledge Signers 2006 Cycle Americans for Tax Reform
Let There Be Light Jonathan Scott Providence Journal Op Ed 04/14/08
 Elect me because I'm bankrupt. Interview with Anchor Rising July 2006

External links
https://web.archive.org/web/20100829072832/http://www.jonforprovidence.com/

1966 births
Living people
American wrestling coaches
Harvard Extension School alumni
Moses Brown School alumni
Politicians from Providence, Rhode Island
Rhode Island Republicans
University of Rhode Island alumni